Rami Duani (born May 24, 1987) is a former Israeli footballer.

References

1987 births
Living people
Israeli Jews
Israeli footballers
Association football central defenders
Maccabiah Games medalists in football
Maccabiah Games gold medalists for Israel
Hapoel Tel Aviv F.C. players
Hapoel Kfar Saba F.C. players
Maccabi Ahi Nazareth F.C. players
Hapoel Petah Tikva F.C. players
Israeli Premier League players
Liga Leumit players
Israel under-21 international footballers
Footballers from Hadera
21st-century Israeli people